(also ) are male actors who play female roles in kabuki theatre.

History

In the early 17th century, shortly after the emergence of the genre, many kabuki theaters had an all-female cast, with women playing men's roles as necessary. ("adolescent-boy kabuki"), with a cast composed entirely of young men playing both male and female roles, and frequently dealing in erotic themes, originated circa 1612.

All-male casts became the norm after 1629, when women were banned from appearing in kabuki due to the prevalent prostitution of actresses and violent quarrels among patrons for the actresses' favors. This ban failed to stop the problems, since the young male actors were also fervently pursued by patrons.

In 1642,  roles were forbidden, resulting in plays that featured only male characters.

After film was introduced in Japan at the end of the 19th century, the  continued to portray females in movies until the early 1920s. At that time, however, using real female actresses was coming into fashion with the introduction of realist  films. The  staged a protest at Nikkatsu in 1922 in backlash against the lack of work because of this. Kabuki, however, remains all-male even today.

 continue to appear in kabuki today, though the term  has come to be used much more commonly. Every kabuki actor is expected to have facility with  techniques. These include learning  makeup, which is vastly different from that of a male character's, and adopting traditional feminine mannerisms. Some of the techniques that  actors have to master with years of training and research include being able to move gracefully across the stage when wearing geta, adopting a more feminine posture and physical mannerisms, and speaking at a higher pitch throughout the entire performance. Many actors specialise in  roles, such as Bandō Tamasaburō V.

Notable 
 Bandō Tamasaburō V
 Daigoro Tachibana
 Kataoka Nizaemon XII
 Nakamura Jakuemon IV
 Nakamura Shichinosuke II
 Nakamura Utaemon VI
 Onoe Kikugorō V
 Sawamura Tanosuke III (1845–78; ; only occasionally Sawamura written as ).
 Sakata Tōjūrō IV
 Taichi Saotome
 Yoshizawa Ayame I

See also
 Japanese theatre
 
  for male prostitutes generally
Cross-gender acting
Drag show

Pantomime dame
Travesti (theatre)
Womanless wedding

Notes

References

Cross-dressing
Japanese culture
Kabuki
Theatre in Japan
Japanese words and phrases